Juan Lozano Bohórquez (born 30 August 1955) is a Spanish former footballer who played as an attacking midfielder. Former world class player, he is regarded as one of the three best foreign players to have ever played in the Belgian League, together with Robbie Rensenbrink and Wlodek Lubanski.

Club career
Born in Coria del Río, Province of Seville, Lozano's parents migrated to Belgium when he was still very young. He lived near K. Beerschot VAC's stadium, and joined its youth system at age 11, making his senior debut in 1974 at the age of 19 and soon standing out for his outstanding dribbling skills.

Lozano moved to the United States in 1980 to play for the Washington Diplomats, but soon returned to Belgium, being acquired by R.S.C. Anderlecht where he continued to regularly put on stellar performances. In 1982–83, he was instrumental in the Brussels side's UEFA Cup conquest – a 2–1 aggregate win against S.L. Benfica – scoring in the second leg in Lisbon with his head.

In the summer of 1983, Real Madrid bought the 28-year-old Lozano whom, in spite of limited playing time, did net six goals in La Liga, also winning another UEFA Cup. He subsequently returned to Anderlecht, continuing his success there as he came close to being awarded the Golden Shoe a couple of times.

On 11 April 1987, Lozano's career all but came to an end after a tackle by K.S.V. Waregem's Ivan Desloover, which resulted in a broken leg. He still won the Footballer of the Year award for the season as his team went on to win three leagues in a row, but would never return to his previous form.

Lozano ended his professional career with S.C. Eendracht Aalst at almost 35, appearing in 18 matches for the second division club in the 1989–90 campaign. He still played some amateur football, with Berchem Sport.

Honours

Club
Beerschot
Belgian Cup: 1978–79

Anderlecht
Belgian Pro League: 1985–86, 1986–87
Belgian Cup: 1987–88, 1988–89
Belgian Supercup: 1981, 1985, 1986, 1987
UEFA Cup: 1982–83
Jules Pappaert Cup: 1983, 1985
Bruges Matins: 1985, 1988

Real Madrid
UEFA Cup: 1984–85

Individual
Belgian Professional Footballer of the Year: 1987

References

External links
Beerschot Hall of Fame 
Anderlecht biography 

1955 births
Living people
People from Coria del Río
Sportspeople from the Province of Seville
Spanish emigrants to Belgium
Spanish footballers
Belgian footballers
Footballers from Andalusia
Association football midfielders
Belgian Pro League players
Challenger Pro League players
K. Beerschot V.A.C. players
R.S.C. Anderlecht players
S.C. Eendracht Aalst players
North American Soccer League (1968–1984) players
Washington Diplomats (NASL) players
La Liga players
Real Madrid CF players
UEFA Cup winning players
Spanish expatriate footballers
Belgian expatriate footballers
Expatriate soccer players in the United States
Belgian expatriate sportspeople in the United States
Spanish expatriate sportspeople in the United States
Footballers from Antwerp